The Four Horsemen of the Apocalypse was to be a video game centered on the actions of several playable characters that are left on earth after the Rapture. These characters were widely different and ranged from a fallen priest to a young stripper and would each have special weapons and abilities specific to themselves.

In late 2002, The 3DO Company, the game's developer, announced that the game would be released on Microsoft Windows, PlayStation 2, GameCube, and Xbox. It was also announced that 3DO would be partnering with Stan Winston on the game as a producer. Stan Winston has been involved in designing creature effects for such films as Jurassic Park, Terminator 2: Judgment Day, and Aliens. The game was basically scrapped after the company went bankrupt in May 2003. However, some hope was rekindled of a release in 2004 when the game's creator, Michael Mendheim, announced that the IP was "far from dead".

Cast

References

External links
 www.fourhorsemenoftheapocalypse.com,
 IGN: Cube,
 PS2,
 Xbox,
 Win

Cancelled GameCube games
Cancelled PlayStation 2 games
Cancelled Xbox games
Cancelled Windows games